Webbianus m.,  Webbiana f. or Webbianum n. may refer to several flora or fauna species including:

Bellevalia webbiana, a plant species
Caulerpa webbiana, a seaweed species
Lampadia webbiana, a land snail species
Leptotes webbianus, a butterfly species
Nanorrhinum webbianum, a cancerwort species found only in Cape Verde
Patellifolia webbiana, a beet species endemic to the island of Gran Canaria, Canary Islands
Rheum webbianum, a plant species
Rosa webbiana, a rose species
Sinosuthora webbiana, the vinous-throated parrotbill
Ulmus minor 'Webbiana', an elm cultivar

Synonyms
Abies webbiana, synonym of Abies spectabilis
Beta webbiana, synonym of Patellifolia webbiana
Kickxia webbiana, synonym of Nanorrhinum webbianum
Lonicera webbiana, synonym of Lonicera alpigena 
Paradoxornis webbianus, synonym of Sinosuthora webbiana
Suthora webbiana, synonym of Sinosuthora webbiana